"Duffless" is the sixteenth episode of the fourth season of the American animated television series The Simpsons. It originally aired on the Fox network in the United States on February 18, 1993. After getting arrested for drunk driving, Homer tries to remain sober, at Marge's request. Meanwhile, Lisa attempts to prove that Bart is less intelligent than a hamster after he ruins her first science fair project.

The episode was written by David M. Stern, and directed by Jim Reardon. 
The episode had a positive reception.

Plot
While having breakfast with her family, Lisa shows them her project for an upcoming science fair, a steroid-enhanced tomato she hopes will cure world hunger. At school, three days before the fair, Lisa leaves her tomato in Bart's care for a moment and he hurls it at Principal Skinner's butt. When Lisa returns, she is furious. She asks Marge for help, who suggests she run a hamster through a maze. Lisa likes the idea, but instead pits a hamster against Bart to find out who is smarter. After two easy tests, the hamster leads two to zero. Bart later discovers her plans to humiliate him at the fair and pre-empts them with a project of his own, "Can hamsters fly planes?", showing her hamster in the cockpit of a miniature plane. Despite Lisa's objection concerning the lack of scientific merit, everyone is distracted by how cute the hamster is, and a proud Skinner hands Bart the winning ribbon.

Meanwhile, Homer sneaks out early at the Springfield Nuclear Power Plant and accompanies Barney on a tour of the Duff brewery. Afterward, Homer refuses to let a drunk Barney drive home and forces him to hand over his keys. On their way out of the parking lot, their car is pulled over by police Chief Wiggum, along with Eddie and Lou. They administer a breathalyser test to Homer, which he fails. He is arrested, loses his license, and must attend traffic school and Alcoholics Anonymous meetings. In bed, Marge gives Homer a magazine quiz about his drinking. Hearing Homer's answers, Marge asks him to give up beer for a month, and he agrees to. He exhibits more positive changes like losing weight, saving over $100 and not sweating while eating. After thirty days of sobriety, despite many temptations, Homer goes back to Moe's for a beer, but leaves after a steady, appraising look at Barney and the other barflies. He and Marge ride a bike into the sunset singing "Raindrops Keep Fallin' on My Head".

Production
Bart's go-go ray idea was "stolen" from the opening credits of Jonny Quest. Mike Reiss said they did not want to show the hamster getting shocked but had to for plot purposes. The first line Richard Nixon says, during the Duff commercial, was taken verbatim from the Kennedy-Nixon Debate during the 1960 Presidential Campaign. Adolf Hitler's head, among other things, can be seen going by in bottles of Duff when the quality control man is not paying attention. The Troy McClure driver's education film title Alice's Adventures Through the Windshield Glass was pitched by Frank Mula.

The episode contains the first appearance of Sarah Wiggum. The episode also contains a two-second snippet of footage from "Bart the Daredevil": a close-up of Homer making a disappointed face and saying "D'oh!" when he gets arrested.

Cultural references

When Bart reaches for the cupcakes and collapses, it is a parody of a scene in A Clockwork Orange, where the main character Alex reaches for a woman's breasts. Duff is shown to be a sponsor in the 1960 United States presidential debates. The Duff clock is a parody of the "It's a Small World" clock. In the Duff TV advertisement, a group of women were leading an anti-sexism protest in front of the McMahon and Tate building, a reference to the advertising agency from Bewitched. The scene toward the end where Moe points toward individual customers declaring they will "be back" before pointing toward and addressing the viewer (later revealed to be Barney via a cutaway) is a parody of the end of the film Reefer Madness. The final scene, where Homer and Marge cycle into the distance while "Raindrops Keep Fallin' on My Head" plays is a reference to the film Butch Cassidy and the Sundance Kid. Homer's song "It was a Very Good Beer" is sung to the tune of the 1961 song "It Was a Very Good Year"; one of its lyrics is Homer stating he stayed up and listened to the music of the British band Queen. Bart sitting in the chair, stroking the hamster is a reference to James Bond character Ernst Stavro Blofeld, who strokes a cat in his chair. Lisa imagines Bart as a hamster trapped in a maze saying "Help me! Help me!" which is a reference to The Fly. Lisa claims she was laughing at a joke from the series Herman's Head, a series that features Lisa's voice actor Yeardley Smith and fellow cast member Hank Azaria. Bart makes several actions reminiscent of The Three Stooges through out the episode.

Reception
"Duffless" aired during February sweeps and finished 19th in the weekly ratings for the week of February 15–21, 1993 with a Nielsen rating of 15.2 and was viewed in 14.2 million homes. It was the highest rated show from the Fox Network that week.

The authors of the book I Can't Believe It's a Bigger and Better Updated Unofficial Simpsons Guide, Warren Martyn and Adrian Wood, said, "A superb episode with a sincere message. Homer is excellent throughout, but it is the cameos by Principal Skinner and Edna Krabappel that steal the show, especially the latter's reaction to Milhouse's Slinky."

Entertainment Weekly ranked the episode as number eleven on their list of the top twenty-five The Simpsons episodes.

References

External links

 

1993 American television episodes
The Simpsons (season 4) episodes
Television episodes about alcohol abuse